Vocal rest or voice rest is the process of resting the vocal folds by not speaking and singing typically following viral infections that cause hoarseness in the voice, such as the common cold or influenza or more serious vocal disorders such as chorditis or laryngitis. Vocal rest is also recommended after surgery to removal of vocal fold lesions, such as vocal fold cysts.

The purpose of vocal rest is to hasten recovery time. It is believed that vocal rest, along with rehydration, will significantly decrease recovery time after a cold. It is generally believed, however, that if one needs to communicate one should speak and not whisper. The reasons for this differ; some believe that whispering merely does not allow the voice to rest and may have a dehydrating effect, while others hold that whispering can cause additional stress to the larynx.

References

Singing
Human voice